Monica Cristina Anisie (born 19 July 1973) is a Romanian politician affiliated with the National Liberal Party (PNL). She served as Minister of Education and Research in the first Orban cabinet led by former Prime Minister Ludovic Orban between November 2019 until March 2020. She also served in this position in the second Orban cabinet between March 2020 and December 2020.

References 

Living people
1973 births
Place of birth missing (living people)
21st-century Romanian politicians
21st-century Romanian women politicians
Romanian Ministers of Education